Purli is a village in Regidi Amadalavalasa mandal of Srikakulam district, Andhra Pradesh, India.

Notable people
 Kemburi Ramamohan Rao, a member of the legislative assembly, was born in the village

References

Villages in Srikakulam district